Deroy Elizandro Rhoode (born 28 October 1988 in George) is a South African rugby union player, currently playing with SWD Premier League club side Evergreens. His regular position is scrum-half or full-back.

Career

Youth
He played for the  team in the 2007 Under-19 Provincial Championship competition and for the  team in the 2007, 2008 and 2009 Under-21 Provincial Championship competitions.

SWD Eagles
In 2010, he made eight appearances in the 2010 Vodacom Cup, 2010 Currie Cup First Division and 2010 Currie Cup promotion/relegation competitions.

He became a more established member of the team in 2011, playing in eight Vodacom Cup matches and ten Currie Cup matches. A further twelve matches followed in 2012.

References

South African rugby union players
Living people
1988 births
People from George, South Africa
SWD Eagles players
Rugby union scrum-halves
Rugby union players from the Western Cape